Myoma Nyein (born Kyaw Nyein, 25 January 1909 – 15 September 1955) was a renowned Burmese musician and composer. He was a founder of Myoma Band, the longest surviving music band in the modern Burmese history. Between 1935 and 1939, he recorded over 40 albums and composed a couple of Myanmar New Year (Thingyan) songs that became iconic, performed on Myoma's Silver Swan parade floats, which became a trademark of Thingyan celebration in Mandalay.

Early life and education
Nyein was born on 25 January 1909 in Mandalay, British Burma, son of U Nyi, a goldsmith, and mother Daw Chit Oo, a lacquerware merchant. He was educated at Central National School, Mandalay.

At the age of ten, he learnt a Burmese classic titled "Jambu Kyun Lone" (Universal) from Deva Einda Maung Maung Gyi in a single day much to the surprise of the famous harpist. In 1925, he co-founded the Myoma (meaning 'City Proper') music band or Myoma Amateur Music Association with his teacher artist and musician U Ba Thet and a city burgher Dahdan U Thant.

Repertoire
Myoma Nyein's greatest love song was "Chit Da Phadana" (Love is Fundamental), the gramophone recording made circa 1935-38.

One of his earlier songs written in 1939 was "Eindawya Paya Zay" in support of Mandalay's central Zegyo Market shopkeepers' all out strike against Section 23(7) enacted by the British colonial government when they relocated to the Eindawya Pagoda precincts.

During the Second World War, the music troupe along with the townspeople of Mandalay fled to Sagaing Hills across the Ayeyarwady River, and Myoma Nyein came up with the song "Sagaing Taung" (Sagaing Hills) among others.

After the war in 1945, when Mandalay held a major sporting event, Myoma Nyein wrote for the occasion songs titled "Olympics" and "Yin Dago Me" (Beauty Contest). His song for the 1947 Burmese New Year Thingyan "Shwe Man Taung Yeikkho" aka "Mya Nandar" (In the Shade of Mandalay Hill) has become a perennial classic during the festive season.   In 1952 he wrote "Lu Chun Lu Gaung" (Good and Able) in honour of Prime Minister U Nu's Pyidawtha (Welfare state) Conference in Rangoon. The following year he composed "Gaba Nyeinchan Yay" (World Peace). He started collaborating with Mandalay Motion Picture Company the next year.

Family
In 1928 Myoma Nyein married Than May, a school teacher from Meiktila.
His oldest daughter Tin Kyi was married to the artist Paw Oo Thet.
His oldest son Shoon Myaing has carried on with the band which celebrated its 80th anniversary in 2005.

Death
Nyein committed suicide in 1955, aged 46, by walking in front of a lorry.

Discography
Thet Wai
Natshinnaung
Sagaing Hill
Hna Yaut Tae Nay Shin Tae
Yae Cho Seik
Soe Naunt Byar Bwae
Ka Thit Pann
Tain Lwar Mohh Mo Lwin
Lu Chun Lu Kaung
Turiyar Luu Lin
Eain Taw Yar Pha Yar Zay
Myin Khin Taw
Nann Myo Taw
Mae Zar Shwe Li/ Lat We Thon Da Ya
Pyo Mhar Tann
Parami Taw
Sar So Khan La Lone
Hla Myint Zu
Man Dar Li
Mae Dar Wi
Thissa
Eain Thu Pe Pe
Binjo
A Hla Pyaing Pwe
Ko Duu Ko Chun

Notes

External links
Official website of The Myoma Amateur Music Association Myanmar
Eighty Years Journey of Mandalay Myoma Band VOA Burmese inc. audio, 2007-02-05
A portrait sketch of Myoma Nyein by Min Kyaw Khine, 2008

Burmese musicians
People from Mandalay
1909 births
1955 suicides
Burmese composers
20th-century composers
Recipients of the Alinkar Kyawswar
Road incident deaths in Asia
Pedestrian road incident deaths
Suicides in Asia